The Czech Republic is often considered the most progressive former Eastern Bloc country in regards to lesbian, gay, bisexual, and transgender (LGBT) rights. In 2006, it legalized registered partnerships (Czech: registrované partnerství) for same-sex couples, and a bill legalizing same-sex marriage was being considered by the Parliament of the Czech Republic before its dissolution for the 2021 Czech legislative election, when it died in the committee stage.

Czech law bans discrimination on the basis of sexual orientation and gender identity. A 2013 Pew Research Center poll showed that 80% of Czechs thought homosexuality should be accepted by society, one of the highest among the 39 countries surveyed. Opinion polls have found increasing levels of support for same-sex marriage, with more than 67% of Czechs supporting the legalization of same-sex marriage as of 2020. The capital city of Prague is internationally famous and notable for its vibrant LGBT nightlife, community, and openness.

Legality of same-sex sexual activity
Same-sex sexual activity was decriminalized in 1962 after scientific research by Kurt Freund led to the conclusion that homosexual orientation cannot be changed (see the History of penile plethysmograph). The age of consent was equalized in 1990 to 15 – it had previously been 18 for homosexuals. The Army does not question the sexual orientation of soldiers, and allows homosexuals to serve openly. Homosexual prostitution was decriminalized in 1990.

Recognition of same-sex relationships

There is legal recognition of same-sex couples. Since 2001, the Czech Republic has granted "persons living in a common household" inheritance and succession rights in housing, as well as hospital and prison visitation rights similar to married heterosexual couples.

A bill legalizing registered partnership, with some of the rights of marriage, was rejected four times, in 1998, 1999, 2001 and 2005. However, on 16 December 2005, a new registered partnership bill was passed by the Czech House of Representatives; it was adopted by the Senate on 26 January 2006, but later vetoed by President Václav Klaus. On 15 March 2006, the President's veto was overturned by the Chamber of Deputies and the law came into force on 1 July 2006. Since this date, the Czech Republic has allowed registered partnerships for same-sex couples, with many of the rights of marriage (except for adoption rights, joint taxes, and the title marriage).

On 12 June 2018, a bill to legalise same-sex marriage, sponsored by 46 deputies, was introduced to the Chamber of Deputies. In response, three days later, a group of 37 deputies proposed a constitutional amendment to define marriage as the union of a man and a woman. The bill allowing same-sex marriage requires a simple majority in the Chamber of Deputies, whereas constitutional amendments require 120 votes. On 22 June 2018, the Government announced its support for the same-sex marriage bill. A vote on the same-sex marriage bill was expected to take place in January 2019, but it was moved to March 2019, and ultimately lapsed with the October 2021 election.

Adoption and family planning
Same-sex couples are currently unable to legally adopt. Single and lesbian couples do not have access to IVF treatments in the country.

In June 2016, the Constitutional Court struck down a ban which forbade people living in registered partnerships from adopting children as individuals. The Government announced its intention to repeal this law upon the pronouncement of the Constitutional Court. In October 2016, a proposal giving couples in registered partnerships the right to adopt their stepchildren was sent to Parliament. Jiří Dienstbier Jr., Minister of the Czech Republic for Human Rights and Equal Opportunities, said that "It’s about securing that the other partner has a legal relationship with the child". The bill died as it was not discussed before the 2017 Czech legislative election.

As of 2019, joint and stepchild adoption by same-sex couples remain illegal. They are being considered as part of a bill to legalise same-sex marriage introduced to the Chamber of Deputies.

In January 2021, it was reported that the Constitutional Court of Czech Republic rejected adoption applications for same-sex couples within registered partnerships.

Discrimination protections

In 2009, a comprehensive anti-discrimination law was passed, which prohibits discrimination on the basis of sexual orientation and gender identity in employment, education, housing and access to goods and services. Section 2 of the Anti-Discrimination Act defines "direct discrimination" as follows:

Gender identity and expression
The first sex reassignment surgery in the country took place in 1942, when a transgender man subsequently changed his legal sex to male. Currently, 50-60 people undergo such surgeries annually in the country.

In order to be covered by health insurance, a request for change of gender markers and treatment is assessed by a committee at the Ministry of Health. After being approved, the applicant undergoes one year of hormonal treatment, which is followed by one year of living in the social role of the other gender, including e.g. wearing what is judged to be "appropriate dress". After this two-year treatment, the applicant's genitalia may be surgically changed.

On June 27, 2021, President Miloš Zeman told CNN Prima News that he did "not understand "transgender people "at all." He claimed: "If you undergo a sex-reassignment surgery, you are committing a crime for inflicting self-harm. It's a very dangerous procedure. These transgenders truly disgust me."

Military service
Since 1999, Czech law has prohibited discrimination based on sexual orientation in the military.

In 2004, the Army of the Czech Republic refused to enter the service of a trans woman, Jaroslava Brokešová, who had previously undergone an official transition, according to assessing doctors. A military spokesperson said that the reason was not her transgender identity. Another trans recruit was rejected in 2014 due to alleged "reduction in the morale of combat units". By 2015, the trans identity of candidates and service candidates was no longer considered relevant to military service.

Blood donation
Gay and bisexual men are allowed to donate blood in the Czech Republic following a one-year deferral period.

Public opinion
In a 1988 survey, 23% of those questioned considered homosexuality a deviation, while in a survey conducted in 1994 only 6% of those asked shared this opinion. Concerning registered partnerships, in a 1994 survey 60% of the respondents expressed themselves in favour of registered partnerships. An opinion poll conducted in 2002 showed 76% of respondents considered a law on registered partnerships to be needed. In 2004, public opinion showed a strong level of support for registered partnerships for same-sex couples, with 60% agreeing with such a law. A 2005 survey showed that 43% of Czechs personally knew someone gay or lesbian, 42% supported same-sex marriage and 62% supported registered partnerships, while only 18% supported same-sex adoption. In 2006, the Eurobarometer showed that 52% of Czechs supported full same-sex marriage (above the EU average of 44%) while 39% supported same-sex adoption. The 2015 Eurobarometer survey indicated a record high support of 57% among the Czechs, a five percent increase from the one in 2006.
The annual CVVM poll on gay rights has shown slightly lower, though increasing, levels of support:

In March 2012, a survey found that 23% of Czechs would not want to have gay or lesbian neighbours. This represented a significant drop from 2003, when 42% of Czechs said that they would not want to have gay or lesbian neighbours.

A 2013 Pew Research Center opinion survey showed that 80% of Czechs believed homosexuality should be accepted by society, while 16% believed it should not. 84% of people between 18 and 29 believed it should be accepted, 87% of people between 30 and 49 and 72% of people over 50.

A 2014 survey by the Academy of Sciences found that support for same-sex marriage had fallen slightly on previous years. In general, those opposing the extension of gay rights across the survey more frequently identified themselves as poor, right-leaning, pensioners and Roman Catholics.

In May 2015, PlanetRomeo, an LGBT social network, published its first Gay Happiness Index (GHI). Gay men from over 120 countries were asked about how they feel about society's view on homosexuality, how do they experience the way they are treated by other people and how satisfied are they with their lives. The Czech Republic was ranked 18th, just above Austria and below Belgium, with a GHI score of 66.

In April 2019, according to a survey conducted by CVVM, 78% of Czechs would not mind having a gay or lesbian neighbor, a 3% increase from 2018.

In June 2019, according to a survey conducted between 4–14 May 2019 by CVVM, 48% of respondents said that homosexuality would not cause difficulties in coexistence with people in the city or community where they live, while 42% disagreed. Compared to 2008, this represented an increase of 11%. The same survey also found that 39% of Czechs have a gay or lesbian friend or acquaintance, whereas 50% do not have one and 11% "don't know". Compared to 2018, this represented a 5% increase.

A Median poll, made public in January 2020, found that 67% of Czechs supported same-sex marriage. It also found that 78% of Czechs agreed that homosexuals and lesbians should be allowed to adopt their spouse's child, and 62% of Czechs supported full, joint adoption rights for same-sex couples. The poll showed that inhabitants of Bohemia were more likely to support LGBT rights than inhabitants of Moravia. It also revealed a large generational gap, with younger respondents overwhelmingly in support, but people aged 55 and above being mostly opposed. A gender gap was found as well, with women being more supportive of same-sex marriage and same-sex adoption than men.

Living conditions
In contrast to the limitations of the communist era, the Czech Republic has become socially relatively liberal since the Velvet Revolution in 1989 and is one of the most gay-friendly countries in the European Union. This increasing tolerance is probably helped by the low levels of religious belief in the country, particularly when compared to its neighbours Poland, Austria and Slovakia.

There is a comparatively large gay community in Prague, much less so in the rest of the country, with the capital acting as a magnet for the country's gay youth. The city has a large and well-developed gay nightlife scene, particularly centred around the district of Vinohrady, with at least 20 bars and clubs and 4 saunas. Gay venues are much more sparsely spread in other Czech towns, however.

In 2012, Fundamental Rights Agency performed a survey on discrimination among 93,000 LGBT people across the European Union. Compared to the EU average, the Czech Republic showed relatively positive results. However, the outcomes also showed that there is still large space for improvement for LGBT rights. 43% of Czech respondents indicated that none or only few of their family members knew about their sexual orientation. Only one in five respondents was open about their sexual orientation to all their colleagues or classmates. 71% of the respondents were selectively open about their orientation at work or school. 52% of gay men and 30% of lesbian women avoided holding hands in public outside of gay neighborhoods for fear of being assaulted, threatened or harassed.

Public events
	
Brno hosts an annual gay and lesbian film festival, known as Mezipatra, with venues also in other cities. It has been held every November since 2000.
	
In the years 2008, 2009 and 2010, a gay festival took place in the country's second largest city of Brno. The first Prague Pride parade took place in August 2011 with official support from Mayor Bohuslav Svoboda and other politicians. The event attracted some negative responses from religious conservative groups and the far-right. The second Prague Pride parade took place in August 2012, establishing the tradition of holding the gay pride parade in Prague annually. Since 2014, the organizers banned any promotional activities of pedophiles at the venues connected with the Prague Pride after several pedophiles drew public attention the preceding year by distributing leaflets stating that "Pedophilia does not equal abuse of children".

Late 2010 saw the introduction of the first officially produced gay guide and map for the Czech capital which was produced by the Prague Information Service, under the aegis of Prague City Council.

Summary table

See also

Recognition of same-sex unions in the Czech Republic
LGBT rights in Europe
LGBT rights in the European Union
LGBT history in the Czech Republic

References

Further reading

External links